Burghley Park Cricket Club is set in the park of Burghley House near Stamford, Lincolnshire. Its pavilion dates from 1892.

Lincolnshire County Cricket Club played Minor Counties Championship matches at Burghley Park  from 1928 to 1990.

John Furley (1847 – 1909) was a club captain. W. G. Grace played at the club early in his career.

References

Cricket grounds in Lincolnshire
Sport in Stamford, Lincolnshire